Kishanpura is an urban area of  Zirakpur in district Mohali in state of Punjab in India. Its been the most hot and dear area for builders and has seen stupendous growth in the past few years. Many commercial and residential projects have and are being built in the area. Kishanpura has an excellent connectivity to Panchkula, Mohali and Chandigarh. The property prices are continuously rising and the living standards and amenities are improving and getting better at a pace, that only can imagine.

Mohali
Villages in Sahibzada Ajit Singh Nagar district